Alfred "Koke" Alexander (February 1, 1888 - death date unknown) was a Negro leagues outfielder who played with several teams from 1918 to 1921. He played with the Dayton Marcos from 1918 to 1920 before splitting the 1921 season with both the Columbus Buckeyes and Chicago Giants. In 1922, he played for the Colored Men's Improvement team based in Dayton, Ohio.

References

External links
 and Baseball-Reference Black Baseball Stats and  Seamheads 

Chicago Giants players
Columbus Buckeyes (Negro leagues) players
Dayton Marcos players
1888 births
Year of death missing
Baseball players from North Carolina
Baseball outfielders